Lithoptila abdounensis is an extinct species of seabird that lived during the Late Paleocene (Thanetian) of Morocco. It is a distant relative of the tropicbirds.

References

Paleocene birds
Prehistoric bird genera
Prophaethontidae
Fossil taxa described in 2005
Fossils of Morocco